Wolfgang Gaston Friedmann (25 January 1907 – 20 September 1972) was a German American legal scholar. Specializing in international law, he was a faculty member at Columbia Law School.

Biography 

Born in Berlin, Friedmann finished his studies of law at the Humboldt University of Berlin in 1930. Being Jewish, he immigrated to the United States shortly after the Nazis' seizure of power in Germany.

Prior to 1955 he was a professor at the University of Toronto Law School in Toronto.

In 1955, he became a professor of international law at Columbia Law School, where he founded the Columbia Journal of Transnational Law. In 1972, he was robbed and stabbed to death in front of Public School 36 at Amsterdam Avenue between 122d and 123d Streets near Columbia's campus in Manhattan. The Wolfgang Friedmann Memorial Award was established in his honor.

References

Further reading 

 

1907 births
1972 deaths
American legal scholars
American legal writers
Jurists from Berlin
German legal scholars
Columbia University faculty
Jewish emigrants from Nazi Germany to the United States
20th-century American non-fiction writers